Bishop Peter Joseph Fan Xueyan (December 29, 1907 – April 13, 1992) was a Chinese Roman Catholic priest and bishop who lived in China during the 20th century. He was bishop of the Roman Catholic diocese of Baoding.

Early life 
He was born in Siao Wang Ting (south of Beijing), China on December 29, 1907.

Priesthood 
He was ordained a priest on December 22, 1934 in Rome and he shortly thereafter returned to China to work in the diocese of Baoding. He worked in parishes, schools, seminaries, and in the Catholic Relief Agency during 1937–1951. His work took him to several provinces in China.

Episcopate 
He was appointed bishop of Baoding diocese on April 12, 1951 and ordained on June 24 of that year. He was consecrated by the archbishop of Hankou, Giuseppe Ferrucio Maurizio Rosà.

Persecution 
The Chinese government sought to control religious activities in the country and in 1957 it instituted the Catholic Patriotic Association (CPA), which is a government mandated organization to oversee the Roman Catholic Church in China. The organization required the church to disavow the authority of the pope and conform to the dictates of the government. Bishop Fan, as well as many other Catholics loyal to the successor of Peter, would not renounce the Pope's authority and he voiced criticism of the CPA. In 1958, Bishop Fan was arrested and sent to a penal farm (a type of forced labour camp) until he was released in 1969. He was kept under continual surveillance until he was arrested again in 1978 for illegal religious activities. He was released in 1979, however, he was arrested again in 1982 for "colluding with foreign forces to jeopardize the sovereignty and security of the motherland" (it was alleged he had had contacts with the Vatican and was secretly ordaining priests in his diocese). He was released in 1987, but placed under house arrest and continually moved around. In November 1990 he went missing and was assumed to have been dead.

Death 
Bishop Fan died of pneumonia on April 13, 1992 according to the director of the liaison department of the Catholic Patriotic Association. According to anonymous sources,  his body was left at the door of his family home in a plastic body bag. His body was found to have had broken bones and other injuries that may have resulted from torture. He may have been the longest serving prisoner of conscience in the world.  It has been reported that underground Christians have called for his canonization.

References

External links

 
 

1907 births
1992 deaths
20th-century Roman Catholic bishops in China